Paradise in Me is the second studio album by Belgian band K's Choice. It was released in 1995 by Double T Music. In the United States, it was released on 20 August 1996 by 550 Music.

The album reached #121 on the U.S. Billboard 200 chart. Six singles were released from the album: "A Sound that Only You Can Hear," "Mr. Freeze," "Not an Addict," "Wait," "Dad," and "Iron Flower." "Not an Addict" reached #5 on the U.S. Modern Rock Tracks chart.

Track listing
All songs were written by Gert and Sam (as Sarah) Bettens.

Notes

 "To This Day" contains an interpolation from Julio Cortázar's book Hopscotch.

Credits and personnel
 Sam Bettens - Vocals, songwriter, composer
 Gert Bettens - Guitar, keyboards, backing vocals, songwriter, composer, drawing
 Jean Blaute -  Bass guitar, guitar, keyboards, producer
 Alain Van Zeveren -  Arranger
 David Haas - Voices
 Kevin Mulligan - Pedal steel guitar
 Vincent Pierins - Bass guitar
 Evert Verhees - Bass guitar
 Erik Verheyden -  Bass guitar
 Bart Van Der Zeeuw - Percussion, backing vocals, drums
 Werner Pensaert -  Engineer
 Tony Platt -  Engineer
 Uwe Teichart - Editing, mastering
 Marc Braspenning - Photography
 Jurgen Rogiers - Photography

Charts

Certifications

Footnotes

References

External links
 [ Paradise in Me] at AllMusic
 

1995 albums
K's Choice albums
Sony Music Belgium albums